Ma Gnucci (Isabella Gnucci) is a fictional character appearing in American comic books published by Marvel Comics. She is an enemy of the Punisher.

Publication history
Created by Garth Ennis and Steve Dillon, the character made her first appearance in The Punisher Vol. 5, #4 (July 2000).

Ma was mentioned and heard (through devices such as telephones and intercoms) in the first three issues of The Punisher Vol. 5, and appeared in person in Issue #4; the character was present in the eight subsequent installment of the volume, and also played a part in the events of Deadpool Vol. 1, #54-55, and Punisher War Zone Vol. 2, #1-6.

Ma received entries in Marvel Encyclopedia #5, All-New Official Handbook of the Marvel Universe #4, and Official Handbook of the Marvel Universe A-Z #4.

Fictional character biography

Welcome Back, Frank
When the Punisher resumes his war on crime in New York City, he announces his return by killing the three sons of Isabella "Ma" Gnucci, the head of New York's largest remaining Mafia family. Ma uses her influence and connections to have the NYPD create a "Punisher Task Force" (which, unbeknownst to Ma, is a sinecure consisting of only two people) while also having her consigliere hire three assassins to eliminate Punisher, who kills them, and then kills the consigliere. The Punisher follows this up by murdering Ma's brother and underboss Dino with a sniper rifle.

While tracking Ma and her bodyguards, the Punisher is spotted and chased into the Central Park Zoo, where he releases the captive animals as a distraction. Ma loses her scalp and all four of her limbs to a group of polar bears, but survives. Ten days after being mauled, Ma offers a reward of ten million dollars to anyone who can kill the Punisher. This leads to one of the Punisher's neighbors tipping Ma off to the vigilante's whereabouts, which prompts Ma to send the entire Gnucci family to kill him. The Punisher guns down the mobsters, but sustains injuries during the battle that leave him temporarily incapacitated. With the Punisher weakened, Ma hires the Russian, a near-superhuman mercenary, to finish him off.

The Punisher slays the Russian, drives to Ma's mansion, and intimidates her few remaining men into surrendering by showing them the Russian's severed head. The Punisher then sets Ma's mansion ablaze while she helplessly screams insults at him. As fire consumes the building, Ma throws herself out a window, and tries to attack the Punisher by gnawing on his leg. The Punisher simply punts Ma back into her blazing home, where she is immolated.

Legacy
Peter, Ma's nephew and the last living Gnucci, learns that he stands to inherit his aunt's fortune, but only in the event of the Punisher's death. To that end, Peter hires Deadpool to kill the Punisher; when the Punisher is falsely assumed to be dead, Peter receives his cheque, which he loses in traffic. While Peter is chasing the cheque, he realizes that he can ask the bank for a new one, only to then be instantly killed when a truck knocks him onto the horns of the Charging Bull.

Ma Gnucci reappears nine years after her death, claiming to have escaped from Hell itself with the intention of uniting the entirety of New York's underworld against the Punisher. In actuality, Ma's "resurrection" is a hoax orchestrated by the Elite, a criminal mastermind who has quadriplegic women surgically altered to mimic Ma's injuries so he can use her reputation to rise to power. When his plans fall apart, the Elite has all of the women he hired murdered to cover his tracks. The Punishers later finds and kills him and his associates.

In other media

Video games
 Ma Gnucci appears in The Punisher video game, voiced by Saffron Henderson. Ma hires Bushwacker to assassinate the Punisher in retaliation for the Punisher's involvement in the deaths of her sons, Eddie and Bobbie Gnucci. The Punisher blasts his way into the Gnucci family mansion and defeats Bushwacker in the library before confronting a cowering Ma and killing her.

References

External links
Ma Gnucci at Marvel Wikia
Ma Gnucci at Comicvine

Characters created by Garth Ennis
Comics characters introduced in 2000
Fictional amputees
Fictional characters from New York City
Fictional characters with disfigurements
Fictional Italian American people
Fictional gangsters
Fictional murdered people
Punisher characters